JDS Iwase (DE-219) was the fifth ship of the s of Japan Maritime Self-Defense Force.

Development and design 
The main anti-submarine (ASW) weapon was changed from the M/50  ASW rocket launcher to the ASROC anti-submarine missile. The octuple launcher for ASROC was stationed at the mid-deck, and the entire ship design was prescribed by this stationing.

Construction and career
Iwase was laid down on 6 August 1971 at Mitsui Engineering & SHipbuilding, Tamano and launched on 29 June 1972. The vessel was commissioned on 12 December 1972 into the 34th Escort Corps of the Sasebo District Force.

On August 2, 1981, during an exhibition training at Goto-nada, the front lid of a left-sided short torpedo launcher blew in the south of Otate Island, Nagasaki Prefecture, due to an explosion of compressed air, injuring three viewers.

On March 20, 1982, she departed Etajima with 50 first-time lieutenants from the 34th flight executive candidate course, leading JDS Mikuma and JDS Michishio as flagships for voyage training toward Guam.

On May 13, 1985, the Soviet Navy Kashin-class destroyer was discovered by Iwase, 70 km northwest of Fukue Island, Nagasaki Prefecture.

On March 24, 1987, she was reorganized into the 31st Maizuru District Force Escort Corps and transferred to Maizuru.

On June 20, 1991, she was reorganized into the 34th Sasebo District Force Escort Corps and transferred to Sasebo again.

On March 19, 1994, 65 graduates of the 46th flight executive candidate course departed for practical training in the Philippines, along with JDS Chikugo and JDS Nadashio. After passing through Chichijima Futami, Guam Island Appla, Philippines Manila, and Okinawa Katsuren, she returned to Sasebo on June 27.

Reorganized into the 23rd Sasebo District Force Escort Corps on March 24, 1997.

On August 29, 1997, she arrived at Naha Port with JDS Tone. On September 1 of the same year, she participated in the Okinawa Comprehensive Disaster Prevention Drill with JDS Sawakaze and JDS Tone.

Removed from the register on October 16, 1998.

References

1972 ships
Ships built by Mitsui Engineering and Shipbuilding
Chikugo-class destroyer escorts